Võhma is a town in Põhja-Sakala Parish, Viljandi County, central Estonia.

History
The settlement dates to the sixteenth century. It began to grow when a railway station, located on the Tallinn - Viljandi railway line operated by Elron (rail transit), opened in 1899. Võhma was named a borough in 1945 and a town in 1993. In the period from 1928 to 1996 it was largely known for its slaughterhouse. The closure of the slaughterhouse caused a spike in unemployment, but the town has somewhat rebounded since then.

During the Cold War it was home to Võhma air base.

Notable residents
Jarmo Ahjupera (born 1984), professional footballer. 
Riho Lahi (1904–1995), writer, journalist and cartoonist.

Gallery

References

External links 

Populated places in Viljandi County
Former municipalities of Estonia
Cities and towns in Estonia
Põhja-Sakala Parish